Rafael Vecina Aceijas (born April 26, 1964 in Badalona, Spain) is a retired basketball player. He played 24 games for the Spain national team.

Clubs
1984-86: Joventut Badalona
1986-92: CB Málaga
1992-94: CB Estudiantes
1994-96: CB Salamanca
1996-98: CB Estudiantes

References
 ACB player profile
 ACB coach profile

1964 births
Living people
Spanish men's basketball players
Basketball players from Catalonia
Liga ACB players
Joventut Badalona players
Baloncesto Málaga players
CB Estudiantes players
Centers (basketball)
People from Badalona
Sportspeople from the Province of Barcelona
1994 FIBA World Championship players